Ulich is a surname. Notable people with the surname include:

David C. Ulich, American film producer and attorney
Ivo Ulich (born 1974), Czech footballer
Johann Ulich, German organist and composer
Max Ulich (1896–1964), Generalmajor in the Wehrmacht during World War II

See also
Uhlich
Uhlig
Surnames from given names